This is a list of Florida municipalities that are located entirely on islands.
Most of the island municipalities of Florida are located on barrier islands. , about 700,000 people lived on barrier islands in Florida. All but three of the other island municipalities in Florida are in the Florida Keys, or on artificial islands in Biscayne Bay.

Notes

References 

 List
 
Florida-related lists